WBTN may refer to:

 WBTN-FM, a radio station (94.3 FM) licensed to Bennington, Vermont, United States
 WBTN (AM), a radio station (1370 AM) licensed to Bennington, Vermont, United States